George A. Gittens (January 16, 1909 – September 19, 1974) was an American film editor. He was a member of the American Cinema Editors. Gittens was buried in Forest Lawn Memorial Park.

Selected filmography 
 Don't Bother to Knock (1952)
 Bloodhounds of Broadway (1952)
 The Silver Whip (1953)
 City of Bad Men (1953)
 Gorilla at Large (1954)
 Princess of the Nile (1954)
 White Feather (1955)
 Robbers' Roost (1955)
 A Life in the Balance (1955)
 The Killer Is Loose (1956)
 A Kiss Before Dying (1956)
 Nightmare (1956)
 Hot Cars (1956)
 Pharaoh's Curse (1957)
 Bailout at 43,000 (1957)
 Appointment with a Shadow (1957)
 Voice in the Mirror (1958)
 Kathy O' (1958)
 The Monster of Piedras Blancas (1959)
 Curse of the Undead (1959)
 The Wild and the Innocent (1959)
 Town Tamer (1965)
 The Legend of Custer (1968)

References

External links 

1909 births
1974 deaths
People from New Orleans
American film editors
American television editors
Burials at Forest Lawn Memorial Park (Hollywood Hills)
American Cinema Editors